Victor Harbor is a town in the Australian state of South Australia located within the City of Victor Harbor on the south coast of the Fleurieu Peninsula, about  south of the state capital of Adelaide. The town is the largest population centre on the peninsula, with an economy based upon agriculture, fisheries and various industries. It is also a highly popular tourist destination, with the area's population greatly expanded during the summer holidays, usually by Adelaide locals looking to escape the summer heat.

It is a popular destination with South Australian high school graduates for their end of year celebrations, known colloquially as schoolies.

History 

Victor Harbor lies in the traditional lands of the Ramindjeri clan of the Ngarrindjeri people.

Matthew Flinders in  visited the bay on 8 April 1802 while on the first circumnavigation of the continent, mapping the unsurveyed southern Australian coast from the west.  He encountered Nicolas Baudin in Le Geographe near the Murray Mouth several kilometres to the east of the present day location of Victor Harbor.  Baudin was surveying the coast from the east for Napoleonic France.  Although their countries were at war, each captain was given documents by the other nation's government, stating that the ships were on scientific missions, and were therefore not to be regarded as ships of war. Together, the ships returned to the bay and sheltered, while the captains compared notes. Flinders named the bay Encounter Bay after the meeting.

About the same time two whaling stations were established, one at Rosetta Head (popularly known as "the Bluff") and the other near the point opposite Granite Island. Whale oil became South Australia's first export. From 1839 the whaling station was managed for a time by Captain John Hart, a later Premier of South Australia. The town of Port Victor was laid out on the shores of Victor Harbor in 1863 when the horse-drawn tramway from Goolwa was extended to the harbour. The last whale was caught off Port Victor in 1872.

The municipality of the town of Victor Harbor was proclaimed on 7 May 1914, with Oliver Alexander Baaner appointed as the first mayor.

On 26 December 1936, a one-off motor race meeting was held to the east of the town to commemorate the centenary of South Australia – the South Australian Centenary Grand Prix (often referred to as the 1937 Australian Grand Prix). The circuit was made of public roads, measured 12.6 kilometres in length and featured two long straights, two short straights, and several corners, including the banked Nangawooka Hairpin. Winner of the 240-mile Grand Prix, which was held as a handicap, was Les Murphy in an MG P-type, from Tim Joshua in another P-type and Bob Lea-Wright in a Terraplane Special.

The beaches of Victor Harbour and nearby Port Elliot have been facing rising seas and more has to be done to stop this.

Town name 
The spelling of Victor Harbor, spelled without a u is a curiosity as harbour normally retains the "u" in Australian English. This spelling is found in several geographical names in South Australia, including Outer Harbor or Blanche Harbor. The township of Victor Harbor was proclaimed in 1914 with the spelling "Harbor". The harbour was proclaimed on 27 May 1915 under the Harbors Act 1913, and its name established on 15 June 1921 as "Victor Harbor". The name of the harbour was changed from Port Victor as a result of a near shipwreck blamed on confusion with Port Victoria on the Yorke Peninsula. According to the State Library of South Australia, the lack of the "u" is not influenced by American spelling, but archaic English spelling. The name is not consistently applied. The Victor Harbor Times used "Harbour" in its masthead from 1922 to 1978, before reverting to "Harbor". The Victor Harbour railway station is spelt with the u.

Government 
In 2016, the resident population in the town of Victor Harbor was 4,233 but over the summer holiday season the population almost triples. As at June 2018, the urban population for the built-up coastal area extending from Victor Harbor to Port Elliot and nearby Goolwa was 26,503, having increased at an average annual rate of 1.07% year-on-year over the preceding five years. The population of the local government area of the City of Victor Harbor is 14,954.

Victor Harbor was declared a city in 2000. As a local government area, the City of Victor Harbor includes the surrounding rural area and the contiguous township of Encounter Bay as well as the town of Victor Harbor itself; its total area is 34,463 hectares. It shares boundaries with the District Council of Yankalilla and the Alexandrina Council. The city is in the state electoral district of Finniss and the federal Division of Mayo.

Attractions 

A popular site for visitors is Granite Island, which is connected to the mainland by a short tram/pedestrian causeway. The tram service is provided by the Victor Harbor Horse Drawn Tram, one of the very few horse-drawn tram routes remaining in public transit service. Granite island is home to a large colony of little penguins which are a popular attraction on the island.  These penguins shelter on the island during the night, departing in the morning to hunt for fish before returning at sunset. Sadly this colony of penguins is now almost gone. At the last count in 2012, only seven were found. It is suspected that an increase in long-nosed fur seals in the area may be to blame, however incidents such as those in 1998 where locals apparently kicked several of them to death have also contributed.

The SteamRanger Heritage Railway runs train services, most notably The Cockle Train between Victor Harbor and Goolwa, along the Victor Harbor railway line.

During the months of June to September, whale spotting is a popular attraction. Southern right whales come to the nearby waters to calve and to mate. The South Australian Whale Centre located at Victor Harbor provides hands-on interactive activities and presentations as well as information and whale watching tips. Greenhills Adventure Park offered activities including: waterslides, canoes, rock wall climbing, archery, mini golf, and go-karting, however this attraction has since closed down.  Victor Harbor is the centre of the surf zone known as the "South Coast" to Adelaide and local surfers. Popular surf beaches in the area include Parsons, Waitpinga, Middleton and Goolwa. The Granite Island breakwater usually shields the town from waves. Victor Harbor also offers numerous fishing opportunities varying from offshore reefs for larger boat based anglers to excellent surf fishing on the beaches closer to the Murray Mouth.

The 'Urimbirra Wildlife Park' is a local attraction with a considerable collection of native (and some domestic) animals. The marsupial mammals at the park are koalas, southern hairy-nosed wombats, red kangaroos, western grey kangaroos, agile wallaby, parma wallaby and black-striped wallaby. Other mammals include short-beaked echidnas, dingoes, grey-headed flying foxes, alpacas and domestic sheep. Reptiles include saltwater crocodile, freshwater crocodile, lace monitor, eastern water dragon, inland bearded dragon, eastern blue-tongued lizard, shingleback lizard, carpet python, tiger snake, eastern brown snake and red-bellied black snake. Birds include emus, southern cassowary, wedge-tailed eagle, eastern barn owl, tawny frogmouth, laughing kookaburras, sulphur-crested cockatoos, brush turkey and many others.

Media 
The main newspaper printed locally is the Times (1987–). The newspaper was originally published as The Victor Harbor Times and Encounter Bay and Lower Murray Pilot, with the first edition published on Friday 23 August 1912. On 16 May 1930, the title was briefly altered to Times Victor Harbor and Encounter Bay and Lower Murray Pilot, and on 15 April 1932 until 31 December 1986 it was called Victor Harbor Times.

Other historical publications included the short-lived South Coast News (4- 25 June 1965), printed by A.H. Ambrose, and its "successor", South Coast Sports News (20 June – 4 July 1969), printed by The Ambrose Press.

Festivals and events 
This town hosts a three-day schoolies festival in late November mainly for South Australian school leavers. Victor Harbor hosts the second largest schoolies festival in Australia after the Gold Coast, centering around official festival activities in Warland Reserve. 

These events are managed by the official event organisers and not-for-profit charity, Encounter Youth, and are supported by the local council, SA Police, SA Ambulance and St Johns SA. 

The centre of the town is a dry area (no alcohol) at night and during the Christmas Pageant and New Year's Eve.

Another notable event is the Art Show run by the Rotary Club of Victor Harbor and exhibits of paintings are shown from all over Australia. The event is held in January, during the summer holidays, and the 40th Art Show was held in January 2019. It has grown to become Australia's largest outdoor art exhibition, with more than 10,000 people attending over 9 nine days.

Climate

Victor Harbor has a warm summer Mediterranean climate (Köppen: Csb). Summer average temperatures are significantly lower than most of the state, due largely to the sea breeze moderating temperatures and hot northerlies rarely extending past the hills north of the city.

References

Further reading

External links 

City of Victor Harbor
SteamRanger Heritage Railway
South Australia Central
Tourism South Australia

Ports and harbours of South Australia
Cities in South Australia
Coastal towns in South Australia
Fleurieu Peninsula
Australian Grand Prix
Fishing communities in Australia